The Window of the World is a theme park located in the western part of the city of Shenzhen in the People's Republic of China. It has about 130 reproductions of some of the most famous tourist attractions in the world squeezed into 48 hectares (118 acres). The 108 metre (354 ft) tall Eiffel Tower dominates the skyline and the sight of the Pyramids and the Taj Mahal all in proximity to each other are all part of the appeal of this theme park.

Transportation
The Window of the World Station on Line 1 and Line 2 of the Shenzhen Metro is located directly in front of the park. The Happy Line monorail has a stop near Window of the World.

Monorail and open cars runs inside the park.

In media
In his autobiographical graphic novel Shenzhen, Guy Delisle visits the park with a Chinese acquaintance. The Park was a destination of The Amazing Race 28.

List of major attractions in the Window of the World

Europe region
 The gloriette in the gardens at Schönbrunn Palace and the Johann Strauss monument at Stadtpark of Vienna, 
 The Lion's Mound near Waterloo, 
 The Little Mermaid statue of Copenhagen, 
 
 The Eiffel Tower, Arc de Triomphe, Louvre Pyramid, Notre Dame cathedral, Grande Arche, Fountain of Warsaw, and Fontaine de l'Observatoire in Paris, Île-de-France
 The Palace of Versailles near the town of Versailles, Île-de-France
 Mont Saint-Michel in Normandy
 The Pont du Gard aqueduct of Vers-Pont-du-Gard, Languedoc-Roussillon
 
 The Cologne cathedral of Cologne, North Rhine-Westphalia
Neuschwanstein Castle of Hohenschwangau, Bavaria
 
 The Acropolis of Athens, Attica
 The Lion Gate at Mycenae of Mykines, Argolis
 
 The Colosseum, St. Peter's Basilica, Palazzo Poli, Trajan's Column, and Spanish Steps of Rome, Lazio
 Canals and St. Mark's Square of Venice, Veneto
 The Leaning Tower and cathedral of Pisa, Tuscany
 The Piazza della Signoria of Florence, Tuscany
 The windmills and tulips of the 
 
 The Kremlin's wall and clock towers including Lenin's Mausoleum and Saint Basil's Cathedral of Moscow, Central Federal District
 Winter Palace of Saint Petersburg, Northwestern Federal District
 Kizhi Pogost near Lake Onega in the Republic of Karelia
 
 The Alcázar of Segovia of Segovia, Castile and León
 The Court of the Lions at the Alhambra complex, in Granada, Andalusia
 The Park Güell, in Barcelona, Catalonia
 
 The Palace of Westminster, Buckingham Palace, Tower Bridge of London, England
 Stonehenge, near Salisbury, England
 The Uffington White Horse of Oxfordshire, England

Asia region
 A waterside village of Southeast Asia 
 Angkor Wat of Siem Reap 
 The paifang at Yonghe Temple of Beijing, 
 
 The Taj Mahal of Agra, Uttar Pradesh
 The Great Stupa of Sanchi, Madhya Pradesh
 The Kandariya Mahadeva Temple of Khajuraho, Madhya Pradesh
 The Mahabodhi Temple of Bodh Gaya, Bihar
 The Suryakunda at the Sun Temple of Modhera, Gujarat
 The Bhaja Caves of Pune, Maharashtra
 The Karla Caves of Karli, Maharashtra
 Borobudur of Magelang Regency, 
 
 Persepolis of Marvdasht, Fars Province
 Hakim Mosque of Isfahan, Isfahan Province
 
 The Ishtar Gate of Babylon, Babil Governorate
 The minaret of the Great Mosque of Samarra of Samarra, Saladin Governorate
 
 Mount Fuji
 Tokyo Imperial Palace of Tokyo, Tokyo Prefecture
 The Katsura Imperial Villa of Kyoto, Kyoto Prefecture
 Himeji Castle of Himeji, Hyōgo Prefecture
 The torii at Itsukushima Shrine of Hatsukaichi, Hiroshima Prefecture
 Hōryū-ji of Ikaruga, Nara Prefecture
 The Kuwait Towers of Kuwait City, 
 Wat Xieng Thong of Luang Prabang, 
 The Kek Lok Si Temple of Air Itam, 
 The Shwedagon Zedi Daw of Yangon, 
 The stupa at Swoyambhunath of Kathmandu, 
 Potongmun of Pyongyang, 
 The Merlion statue of Merlion Park, 
 Gyeongbok Palace of Seoul, 
 The Ruwanwelisaya of Anuradhapura,  (Mislabeled as the neighboring Jetavanaramaya)
 The Temple of the Emerald Buddha (Wat Phra Kaew) at the Grand Palace of Bangkok, 
 Hagia Sophia of Istanbul, 
 The One Pillar Pagoda of Hanoi,

Oceania region
 
 The Sydney Opera House and Sydney Harbour Bridge of Sydney, New South Wales
 Uluru (Ayers Rock) of Northern Territory
 Captain James Cook Memorial water jet of Canberra, Australian Capital Territory
 
 The dwelling houses, wharenui, and tekoteko of the Māori people
 Botanical gardens and Moeraki Boulders

Africa region
 The round hut and mud brick style buildings of the continent

 The Pyramids and Sphinx of Giza, Cairo Governorate
 The Great Temple of Abu Simbel, Aswan Governorate
 The Temple of Edfu's entry gate of Edfu, Aswan Governorate
 The Lighthouse of Alexandria
 
 The tusk archways of Mombasa, Mombasa County
 Maasai Mara National Reserve national park in Narok County

America region
 The totem poles and longhouses of the Indigenous peoples of the Pacific Northwest Coast
 
 Mount Corcovado with Christ the Redeemer of Rio de Janeiro, Rio de Janeiro
 The National Congress of Brazil of Brasilia, Federal District
 The Amazon rainforest
 The Moai Statues of Easter Island (Rapa Nui), 
 Brattahlíð of the Eastern Settlement, 
 
 Chichen Itza's El Castillo of Tinúm, Yucatán
 The Temple of the Morning Star with Toltec Warrior Telamons of Tula de Allende, Hidalgo (state)
 An Olmec colossal head
 The linear drawings of Nazca, 
 
 The Mount Rushmore National Memorial of Keystone, South Dakota
 The skyscrapers of the Manhattan and Statue of Liberty of New York City, New York
 The United States Capitol, White House, Lincoln Memorial, National Mall, and Jefferson Memorial of Washington, D.C.
 The Grand Canyon of Arizona
 The volcanoes of Hawaii
 
 Angel Falls of Canaima National Park, Bolívar
 The torrential flash floods of Vargas

Other regions
 Asia-style Street
 Islamic Street
 Church of Europe-Style Street
 The Square of the Atmosphere
 Garden of World Sculptures

See also
List of parks in Shenzhen
 Beijing World Park
 Grand World Scenic Park
 Tianducheng
 Hallstatt (China)

References

External links

 Window of the World Web site  
 Window of the World Overview & Tips And Find Top Attractions in Shenzhen
 Sant Leelavilas: Window of the World, Shenzhen, YouTube, 15 February 2015

Amusement parks in Shenzhen
Miniature parks
Nanshan District, Shenzhen
1993 establishments in China
Eiffel Tower reproductions
Amusement parks opened in 1993
Replica constructions in China